David Welsby (born 25 November 1969) is a former Australian rules footballer who played for Geelong in the Australian Football League (AFL) in 1990. He was recruited from the Sturt Football Club in the South Australian National Football League (SANFL) with the 62nd selection in the 1988 VFL Draft.

References

External links

Living people
1969 births
Geelong Football Club players
Sturt Football Club players
Australian rules footballers from South Australia